Richard Ramirez is an American noise music artist originally from Houston, Texas, recording and performing both as a solo artist and as part of several groups, including Black Leather Jesus, Priest in Shit, An Innocent Young Throat-Cutter, House of the Black Death, Martyr of Sores, Last Rape and the "static noise" solo project Werewolf Jerusalem. He is notable for being one of the earliest American harsh noise artists.

Ramirez draws a distinction between his relatively few professionally printed CDs and LPs and the many CD-Rs and tapes he produces for smaller record labels.  He has done collaborations and split releases with many important figures in the noise field, including Merzbow, Emil Beaulieau, Kommissar Hjuler & Mama Baer, Skin Crime, The Haters, Prurient, Smell & Quim, Macronympha, Stabat Mors, Kenji Siratori, Sudden Infant, and MSBR.

Ramirez's work tends to consist of long, slowly changing or static tracks of heavily distorted low- to mid-range noise, with a gradual move over the last several years toward more drone-influenced sounds in addition to his harsh noise work. Parallel to this evolution has been a shift in thematic concerns, with album covers, titles, and general themes changing from more typical noise music concerns such as violence and war (largely borrowed from industrial culture) to a focus on homosexual themes and gay pornography artwork. In addition to his musical work, Ramirez also runs the noise and experimental music label Deadline Recordings. Ramirez is also an "avant-garde" fashion designer under the alias, Richard Saenz.
He recently collaborated with Giovanni Mori, musician power noise, mind of the project L.C.B., his album Born (Old Europa Cafe in 2015) and has also made with L.C.B. an album on cassette entitled "Homo Sense" (Black Leather Jesus - Le Cose Bianche, Signora Ward Records).

In late 2016, Ramirez started a new noise label with his husband, Sean E. Matzus, called Next Halloween. The two are now based near Pittsburgh, Pennsylvania.

References

External links
An interview with Richard Ramirez 
Deadline Recordings official site
Next Halloween

American noise musicians
Musicians from Houston
Living people
American gay musicians
Year of birth missing (living people)
LGBT people from Texas
Power electronics musicians